Pasir Panjang Single Member Constituency was a constituency in Singapore. It used to exist from 1955 to 1988.

Member of Parliament

Elections

Elections in the 1960s

Elections in 1970s

Elections in 1980s

Historical maps

References

Singaporean electoral divisions